Dirty rice is a traditional Louisiana Creole dish made from white rice which gets a "dirty" color from being cooked with small pieces of pork, beef or chicken, green bell pepper, celery, and onion, and spiced with cayenne and black pepper.  Parsley and chopped green onions are common garnishes.  Dirty rice is most common in the Creole regions of southern Louisiana; however, it can also be found in other areas of the American South and referenced as "chicken and rice," "Cajun rice," or "rice dressing".

Origins 
The earliest versions of this dish trace back to the Antebellum era of southern Louisiana in the late 1700s and the 1800s and fall under the category of soul food. During this period, the individuals working the slave trade would bring back crops from Africa, along with captives who knew how to cultivate them in order to grown them on plantations back in the colonies. These crops included sweet potatoes, okra, peanuts, kidney and lima beans, watermelon, and rice. Captive farmers from the coast of West Africa were brought to Louisiana as slaves for their ability to cultivate rice in the marshes and bayous and as a result, rice plantations grew to be a very large and profitable industry for Louisiana plantation owners. The plentiful nature of rice made it very cheap to come by, thus it was a food allotted to slaves as well since it was an essential part of their diet in Africa. Rice was one of the limited foods slaves were permitted to eat on plantations, along with corn, beans, sorghum, succotash, and greens. In addition to these crops, slaves were also given the "undesirable" cuts of the meat served to the plantation owners, the portions that would otherwise be thrown away. This generally included the intestines, neck, feet, head, ears, ribcage, tail, and tongue of the hogs, cow, and chickens present on the plantations. Through these options, slaves had to create meals to feed themselves and their families.

The rice, combined with the organ meat provided by the slave owners, were the primary components of dirty rice. Often, the dish would be made with the hearts, livers, kidneys, gizzards, ribs, and feet of the plantation livestock provided to them.  The meat would be cooked down first, then chopped into fine pieces while the rice cooked. Then, the rice would be mixed in with this meat mixture, and the broth-type "gravy" formed by the meat would give the rice its "dirty" appearance. The "dirtiness" mentioned in the meal's name is likely also due to the choice of meat traditionally included in the dish.

Variations 

After the abolition of slavery in the late 1800s, the dish remained a traditional meal of the freed African Americans due to its affordable and easy-to-make nature. It was later adopted as a "poor man's meal" by the poor White and the Acadian "Cajun" immigrants who also populated the lower class of Southern Louisiana. These individuals would have their own farms and hunt for wild game, allowing them to makes simple meals such as this one to feed their families. Thus, the dish continued to be one associated with poverty. However, as these individuals gained more wealth and with it, access to better ingredients, the recipe saw more expensive additions being incorporated, such as Andouille sausage and ground beef instead of chicken livers and pig intestines. They would also include additional spices, such as bay leaves, garlic, and cayenne pepper. 

As a result, the recipe for dirty rice is one that adapts to the means of the cook and the available ingredients on hand. While ground meat and rice are the two most consistent ingredients, the types of meat vary, and a blend of vegetables such as peppers and onions are often included. The way the dish is seasoned can also vary from simple salt and black pepper, to a more elaborate blend of herbs, spices, hot sauces, and aromatics. 

A well-known variation of this rice dish is another Cajun staple, jambalaya.

Modern variants 
In the wake of healthy eating initiatives, the recipe has experienced some health-conscious variations that include using ground turkey over pork, as well as cooking the dish in vegetable oils instead of oils heavy in trans fats. Additionally, the addition organ meat has largely been substituted for prime cuts of ground beef, chicken and pork.

Other names
Dirty rice is frequently referred to as Cajun Rice in Louisiana and other parts of the South due to the dish's history with the Acadian immigrants of Louisiana. Cajun rice typically incorporates Andouille sausage, bell pepper, celery, and onions along with a blend of traditional Cajun spices. In some southern regions, it is also called rice dressing. Rice dressing may be prepared using ground beef or ground pork, rather than chicken liver and giblets.

Popularity 
Despite its meager origins, dirty rice is considered a staple dish in the American South as an example of "authentic" Louisiana, Creole, and Cajun cooking.   The dish is served as a main course as well as a side, and is often served alongside other traditional Louisianan dishes, including étouffée and gumbo to name a few.  Prepackaged mixes of the rice, vegetables and spices are sold in grocery stores by brands such as Zatarain's, Tony Chachere's, and Louisiana Fish Fry Products--all brands that cater towards traditional Louisiana cuisine. It is a dish commonly served in Louisiana tourist spots and cooked by popular chefs, including celebrity chef and New Orleans restauranteur Emeril Lagasse. It is a well-known dish served in regions all over the South.

See also
 List of rice dishes
Cajun Cuisine 
Soul food

References

External links 
 
 

American rice dishes
Cajun cuisine
Chicken and rice dishes
Cuisine of New Orleans
Cuisine of the Southern United States
Louisiana Creole cuisine
Soul food